The Pennsylvania Railroad's class N2sa comprised rebuilds to PRR practice of the 130 USRA Heavy Santa Fe steam locomotives the railroad received under the auspices of the United States Railroad Administration, the nationalized central control of the nation's railroads during World War I.  These locomotives, as received, were classified N2s.  Rebuilds began from 1923 and all locomotives were rebuilt, classified N2sa after the rebuild.  They received a Belpaire firebox, the PRR-standard smokebox front, a raised headlight following PRR practice, and the bell moved from smokebox front to boiler top. Brakemen's "doghouse" shacks were built on the rear tender decks.

Their assignments were primarily in PRR Lines West (of Pittsburgh), especially after the introduction of the I1s 2-10-0 “Decapods”. The arrival of larger power such as the J1 shifted the N2sa locomotives to more secondary roles.

References 
 
 
 
 

ALCO locomotives
Baldwin locomotives
2-10-2 locomotives
N2sa
Steam locomotives of the United States
Scrapped locomotives
Freight locomotives
Standard gauge locomotives of the United States